Thomas Jones Rogers (1781 – December 7, 1832) was a Democratic-Republican member of the U.S. House of Representatives for Pennsylvania's 6th congressional district from 1818 to 1823 and for Pennsylvania's 8th congressional district from 1823 to 1824.

Early life
Thomas J. Rogers (father of William Findlay Rogers) was born in Waterford, Ireland.  He immigrated to the United States in 1784 with his parents, who settled in Easton, Pennsylvania.  He learned the printing trade and was editor and owner of the Northampton Farmer from 1805 to 1814.

Career
He was a member of the Pennsylvania State Senate for the 8th district from 1815 to 1818. Rogers was elected as a Republican to the Fifteenth Congress to fill the vacancy caused by the resignation of John Ross.  He was reelected to the Sixteenth, Seventeenth, and Eighteenth Congresses and served until April 20, 1824, when he resigned.

He served as a trustee of Lafayette College from 1826 to 1832.  He was a register and recorder of deeds for Northampton County, Pennsylvania, from 1828 to 1830.  He served as brigadier general in the State militia and as an officer in the United States Revenue Customs at the port of Philadelphia.

He died in New York City in 1832 and was interred at the New Market Street Baptist Church Graveyard in Philadelphia, Pennsylvania.  He was reinterred to the Glenwood Cemetery in Philadelphia in 1851 and again to the Glenwood Memorial Gardens in Broomall, Pennsylvania.

Notes

Sources

The Political Graveyard

|-

1781 births
1832 deaths
19th-century American newspaper editors
19th-century American politicians
Irish emigrants to the United States (before 1923)
Burials at Glenwood Cemetery/Glenwood Memorial Gardens
Democratic-Republican Party members of the United States House of Representatives from Pennsylvania
Editors of Pennsylvania newspapers
Lafayette College trustees
Pennsylvania state senators
Politicians from County Waterford